is a Japanese light novel series written by Shinta Fuji and illustrated by Susumu Kuroi. It began serialization online in January 2019 on the user-generated novel publishing website Shōsetsuka ni Narō. It was later acquired by Media Factory, who have published four volumes since September 2019 under their MF Books imprint. A manga adaptation with art by Masaki Kawakami has been serialized online via Kadokawa Shoten's ComicWalker website since October 2019. It has been collected in six tankōbon volumes. An anime television series adaptation produced by Geek Toys premiered in January 2023.

Characters

The main protagonist. He was formerly part of the adventurer's party All Martial Arts until he was expelled following an argument caused by his former teammates embezzling funds. Afterward, he is dumped by his scammer girlfriend and goes through a downward spiral where he wastes his remaining money on idols. However, upon meeting Tiana, Curran, and Zemu and bonding over their shared betrayals, he proposes that they form a new party to fund their spendthrift lifestyles all whilst working to overcome their issues, in his case his tendency to talk down to others.

A former noblewoman and the party's magic caster. 

A dragonkin and the party's warrior. She is the only party member who does not have a bad spending habit, causing her teammates to entrust her with storing their shared funds.

A former priest and the party's healer.

Media

Light novels
The series written by Shinta Fuji began serialization in the user-generated novel publishing site Shōsetsuka ni Narō in January 2019. It was later acquired by Media Factory, who publishing it with illustrations by Susumu Kuroi under their MF Books imprint. The series has released four volumes as of December 23, 2022.

At Sakura-Con 2022, Yen Press announced that they licensed the series for English publication.

Manga
A manga adaptation with art by Masaki Kawakami began serialization on Kadokawa Shoten's ComicWalker website on October 25, 2019.

At Anime Expo 2022, Yen Press announced that they licensed the manga for English publication.

Anime
An anime adaptation was announced at the MF Books 8th Anniversary livestream event on August 15, 2021. It was later revealed to be a television series produced by Frontier Works, animated by Geek Toys in cooperation with Seven, and written and directed by Itsuki Imazaki. Hiroo Nagao is handling the character designs and serving as chief animation director, and Ryo Takahashi is composing the music. The series premiered on January 10, 2023, on Tokyo MX and other networks. The opening theme song is "Glorious World" by Shun'ichi Toki, while the ending theme song is "Never Fear" by Mao Abe. Crunchyroll has licensed the series under the title, Ningen Fushin: Adventurers Who Don't Believe in Humanity Will Save the World, and will be streaming it along with an English dub. Muse Communication also licensed the series in Asia-Pacific and streamed on Muse Asia YouTube channel.

See also
 There's a Demon Lord on the Floor - another manga series illustrated by Masaki Kawakami

Notes

References

External links
  at Shōsetsuka ni Narō 
  
  
  
 

2019 Japanese novels
2023 anime television series debuts
Anime and manga based on light novels
Crunchyroll anime
Geek Toys
Japanese webcomics
Kadokawa Dwango franchises
Kadokawa Shoten manga
Muse Communication
Light novels
Light novels first published online
Seinen manga
Shōsetsuka ni Narō
Tokyo MX original programming
Webcomics in print
Yen Press titles